Brandon Fobbs (born April 19, 1981) is an American actor.

He had a recurring role on  HBO television series The Wire as Fruit. He also appeared in Pride (2007) and This Christmas and The Devil's Tomb.

References

External links

1981 births
Living people
African-American male actors
Male actors from Los Angeles
21st-century African-American people
20th-century African-American people